The Giáp line (Hán tự: 支甲; chi can also be translated to as branch) was the ninth dynasty of Hùng kings of the Hồng Bàng period of Văn Lang (now Viet Nam). Starting approximately 1331 B.C., the line refers to the rule of Quân Lang and his successors, when the seat of government was centered at Phú Thọ.

History
Quân Lang was born approximately 1375 B.C., and took the regnal name of Hùng Định Vương (雄定王) upon becoming Hùng king. The series of all Hùng kings following Quân Lang took that same regnal name of Hùng Định Vương to rule over Văn Lang until approximately 1252 B.C.

The Đồng Đậu culture strongly influenced the processes involved in making ceramic of this period.

References

Bibliography
Nguyễn Khắc Thuần (2008). Thế thứ các triều vua Việt Nam. Giáo Dục Publisher.

Ancient peoples
Hồng Bàng dynasty
13th-century BC disestablishments
14th-century BC establishments